Waukivory is a small town near Gloucester, New South Wales. In , there were 94 people living in Waukivory.

History 
The first European settlers arrived somewhere around 1840–1850. A school opened there in 1897, but closed in 1960. A community hall was opened in 1947.

References 

Mid North Coast